Chalakudy State assembly constituency is one of the 140 state legislative assembly constituencies in Kerala. It is also one of the 7 state legislative assembly constituencies included in the Chalakudy Lok Sabha constituency. As of the 2021 assembly elections, the current MLA is T. J. Saneesh Kumar Joseph of Indian National Congress.

Local self governed segments
Chalakudy Niyamasabha constituency is composed of the following local self-governed segments:

Members of Legislative Assembly 
The following list contains all members of Kerala legislative assembly who have represented the constituency:

Key

Election results

Niyamasabha Election 2021 
There were 1,92,767 registered voters in the constituency for the 2021 election.

Niyamasabha Election 2016 
There were 1,90,675 registered voters in the constituency for the 2016 election.

Niyamasabha Election 2011 
There were 1,76,055 registered voters in the constituency for the 2011 election.

See also
 Chalakudy
 Thrissur district
 List of constituencies of the Kerala Legislative Assembly
 2016 Kerala Legislative Assembly election

References

Assembly constituencies of Kerala

State assembly constituencies in Thrissur district